The 2005–06 Philadelphia Flyers season was the Flyers' 39th season in the National Hockey League (NHL). The Flyers lost in the first round of the playoffs to the Buffalo Sabres in six games.

Off-season
The Flyers were one of the more active teams once the lockout came to an end. Replacing the high-profile names of Tony Amonte, John LeClair and Jeremy Roenick were superstar Peter Forsberg, along with defensemen Derian Hatcher and Mike Rathje, as well as several players from the Calder Cup-winning Philadelphia Phantoms. When all was said and done, the team had experienced a turnover of nearly two-thirds of the roster.

Regular season
The Flyers began the season with lofty expectations. Despite being hampered by injuries prior to and during 2005–06, the Flyers lived up to those expectations in the first half of the season, reaching the top of the league standings in early January while simultaneously holding a nine-point lead in the Atlantic Division. The Deuces Wild line of Forsberg, Simon Gagne and Mike Knuble recorded 75, 79 and 65 points respectively, while Gagne scored a career high 47 goals.

However, the injuries began to accumulate and take their toll. Keith Primeau suffered a concussion on October 25 in Montreal and missed the rest of the season and the playoffs. In late January, Hatcher was named team captain for the duration of Primeau's absence. All told, the Flyers were third in the NHL with 388-man-games lost to injury, tops amongst playoff teams. The second half of the regular season was defined by a record hovering around .500, sending the Flyers on a steady slide in the standings. The Flyers fell short of an Atlantic Division title finishing second by tie-breaker to the New Jersey Devils and drawing the 5th seed and a first round match-up with the Buffalo Sabres.

Season standings

Playoffs
The Flyers lost to Buffalo in six games in the Eastern Conference Quarterfinals.

Schedule and results

Preseason

|-style="background:#cfc;"
| 1 || September 17 || Atlanta Thrashers || 8–6 || 1–0–0 ||
|- style="background:#cfc;"
| 2 || September 21 || New York Islanders || 2–1 || 2–0–0 ||
|- style="background:#cfc;"
| 3 || September 24 || Washington Capitals || 5–2 || 3–0–0 ||
|- style="background:#cfc;"
| 4 || September 27 || New York Islanders || 5–3 || 4–0–0 ||
|- style="background:#cfc;"
| 5 || September 29 || New Jersey Devils || 3–2 || 5–0–0 ||
|- style="background:#fcf;"
| 6 || September 30 || @ New Jersey Devils || 3–5 || 5–1–0 ||
|- style="background:#cfc;"
| 7 || October 1 || @ Washington Capitals || 7–6 SO || 6–1–0 ||
|-
| colspan="6" style="text-align:center;"|
Notes:
 Game played at John Labatt Centre in London, Ontario.
 Game played at Sovereign Bank Arena in Trenton, New Jersey.
|-

|-
| Legend:

Regular season

|- style="background:#fcf;"
| 1 || October 5 || NY Rangers || 5–3 || Philadelphia  ||  || Esche || 19,821 || 0–1–0 || 0 || 
|- style="background:#cfc;"
| 2 || October 7 || New Jersey  || 2–5 || Philadelphia ||  || Niittymaki || 19,590 || 1–1–0 || 2 || 
|- style="background:#fcf;"
| 3 || October 11 || Philadelphia || 2–4 || Toronto  ||  || Esche || 19,391 || 1–2–0 || 2 || 
|- style="background:#cfc;"
| 4 || October 14 || Pittsburgh  || 5–6 || Philadelphia || OT || Niittymaki || 19,566 || 2–2–0 || 4 || 
|- style="background:#cfc;"
| 5 || October 15 || NY Islanders || 1–5 || Philadelphia  ||  || Esche || 19,543 || 3–2–0 || 6 || 
|- style="background:#cfc;"
| 6 || October 22 || Philadelphia || 5–2 || Toronto  ||  || Esche || 19,391 || 4–2–0 || 8 || 
|- style="background:#ffc;"
| 7 || October 25 || Philadelphia || 2–3 || Montreal  || OT || Esche || 21,273 || 4–2–1 || 9 || 
|- style="background:#cfc;"
| 8 || October 27 || Florida || 4–5 || Philadelphia  || OT || Esche || 19,533 || 5–2–1 || 11 || 
|- style="background:#fcf;"
| 9 || October 28 || Philadelphia  || 6–8 || Carolina ||  || Niittymaki || 18,165 || 5–3–1 || 11 || 
|- style="background:#cfc;"
| 10 || October 30 || Philadelphia  || 5–3 || Ottawa ||  || Esche || 19,335 || 6–3–1 || 13 || 
|-

|- style="background:#cfc;"
| 11 || November 3 || Washington  || 1–8 || Philadelphia ||  || Esche || 19,253 || 7–3–1 || 15 || 
|- style="background:#cfc;"
| 12 || November 5 || Atlanta  || 3–4 || Philadelphia ||  || Esche || 19,587 || 8–3–1 || 17 || 
|- style="background:#cfc;"
| 13 || November 8 || Boston || 3–4 || Philadelphia  || OT || Esche || 19,587 || 9–3–1 || 19 || 
|- style="background:#cfc;"
| 14 || November 10 || NY Islanders  || 2–3 || Philadelphia ||  || Niittymaki || 19,601 || 10–3–1 || 21 || 
|- style="background:#cfc;"
| 15 || November 12 || Florida  || 4–5 || Philadelphia ||  || Esche || 19,654 || 11–3–1 || 23 || 
|- style="background:#fcf;"
| 16 || November 14 || Philadelphia || 2–5 || Tampa Bay  ||  || Esche || 20,020 || 11–4–1 || 23 || 
|- style="background:#ffc;"
| 17 || November 16 || Pittsburgh || 3–2 || Philadelphia  || OT || Niittymaki || 19,687 || 11–4–2 || 24 || 
|- style="background:#ffc;"
| 18 || November 18 || Atlanta || 6–5 || Philadelphia  || OT || Esche || 19,533 || 11–4–3 || 25 || 
|- style="background:#cfc;"
| 19 || November 19 || Philadelphia || 6–3 || Pittsburgh  ||  || Niittymaki || 17,132 || 12–4–3 || 27 || 
|- style="background:#fcf;"
| 20 || November 22 || Tampa Bay  || 4–2 || Philadelphia ||  || Esche || 19,567 || 12–5–3 || 27 || 
|- style="background:#cfc;"
| 21 || November 25 || Philadelphia  || 5–3 || Boston ||  || Niittymaki || 17,565 || 13–5–3 || 29 || 
|- style="background:#fcf;"
| 22 || November 26 || NY Islanders  || 4–2 || Philadelphia ||  || Niittymaki || 19,780 || 13–6–3 || 29 || 
|- style="background:#cfc;"
| 23 || November 29 || Philadelphia || 4–2 || NY Islanders  ||  || Esche || 12,354 || 14–6–3 || 31 || 
|- style="background:#cfc;"
| 24 || November 30 || New Jersey  || 1–2 || Philadelphia ||  || Esche || 19,573 || 15–6–3 || 33 || 
|-

|- style="background:#ffc;"
| 25 || December 3 || Philadelphia  || 3–4 || Nashville || SO || Niittymaki || 16,116 || 15–6–4 || 34 || 
|- style="background:#cfc;"
| 26 || December 6 || Calgary || 0–1 || Philadelphia  || SO || Niittymaki || 19,542 || 16–6–4 || 36 || 
|- style="background:#fcf;"
| 27 || December 8 || Edmonton  || 3–2 || Philadelphia ||  || Niittymaki || 19,411 || 16–7–4 || 36 || 
|- style="background:#cfc;"
| 28 || December 10 || Minnesota  || 2–3 || Philadelphia ||  || Niittymaki || 19,592 || 17–7–4 || 38 || 
|- style="background:#cfc;"
| 29 || December 13 || Philadelphia || 3–1 || Columbus  ||  || Esche || 16,263 || 18–7–4 || 40 || 
|- style="background:#fcf;"
| 30 || December 15 || Vancouver || 5–4 || Philadelphia  ||  || Esche || 19,549 || 18–8–4 || 40 || 
|- style="background:#cfc;"
| 31 || December 17 || Philadelphia  || 5–2 || St. Louis ||  || Niittymaki || 15,299 || 19–8–4 || 42 || 
|- style="background:#ffc;"
| 32 || December 19 || Buffalo || 2–1 || Philadelphia  || SO || Niittymaki || 19,572 || 19–8–5 || 43 || 
|- style="background:#cfc;"
| 33 || December 22 || Ottawa  || 3–4 || Philadelphia ||  || Niittymaki || 19,817 || 20–8–5 || 45 || 
|- style="background:#cfc;"
| 34 || December 23 || Philadelphia || 5–4 || Pittsburgh ||  || Niittymaki || 17,132 || 21–8–5 || 47 || 
|- style="background:#cfc;"
| 35 || December 26 || Philadelphia || 3–2 || Florida  || SO || Niittymaki || 18,791 || 22–8–5 || 49 || 
|- style="background:#cfc;"
| 36 || December 28 || Philadelphia || 4–3 || Atlanta  || OT || Niittymaki || 18,545 || 23–8–5 || 51 || 
|- style="background:#cfc;"
| 37 || December 29 || Philadelphia || 4–3 || Carolina  || OT || Niittymaki || 18,730 || 24–8–5 || 53 || 
|- style="background:#ffc;"
| 38 || December 31 || Philadelphia || 3–4 || Washington  || SO || Niittymaki || 16,492 || 24–8–6 || 54 || 
|-

|- style="background:#cfc;"
| 39 || January 2 || Philadelphia || 1–0 || Boston  ||  || Niittymaki || 16,980 || 25–8–6 || 56 || 
|- style="background:#cfc;"
| 40 || January 5 || Philadelphia || 4–3 || NY Rangers  || OT || Niittymaki || 18,200 || 26–8–6 || 58 || 
|- style="background:#cfc;"
| 41 || January 6 || Philadelphia || 3–1 || Washington  ||  || Niittymaki || 16,876 || 27–8–6 || 60 || 
|- style="background:#fcf;"
| 42 || January 9 || Philadelphia || 0–3 || New Jersey  ||  || Niittymaki || 16,015 || 27–9–6 || 60 || 
|- style="background:#cfc;"
| 43 || January 11 || Philadelphia || 5–2 || Chicago  ||  || Niittymaki || 12,003 || 28–9–6 || 62 || 
|- style="background:#fcf;"
| 44 || January 12 || Philadelphia  || 3–6 || Detroit ||  || Niittymaki || 20,066 || 28–10–6 || 62 || 
|- style="background:#ffc;"
| 45 || January 14 || Colorado  || 4–3 || Philadelphia || OT || Niittymaki || 19,953 || 28–10–7 || 63 || 
|- style="background:#ffc;"
| 46 || January 17 || Carolina  || 4–3 || Philadelphia || SO || Niittymaki || 19,572 || 28–10–8 || 64 || 
|- style="background:#fcf;"
| 47 || January 19 || Boston || 5–2 || Philadelphia  || || Niittymaki || 19,618 || 28–11–8 || 64 || 
|- style="background:#cfc;"
| 48 || January 21 || Philadelphia  || 2–1 || Pittsburgh ||  || Esche || 17,132 || 29–11–8 || 66 || 
|- style="background:#cfc;"
| 49 || January 23 || Pittsburgh || 2–4 || Philadelphia  ||  || Niittymaki || 19,726 || 30–11–8 || 68 || 
|- style="background:#fcf;"
| 50 || January 25 || Montreal  || 5–3 || Philadelphia ||  || Esche || 19,711 || 30–12–8 || 68 || 
|- style="background:#fcf;"
| 51 || January 28 || Tampa Bay  || 6–0 || Philadelphia ||  || Niittymaki || 19,789 || 30–13–8 || 68 || 
|- style="background:#cfc;"
| 52 || January 30 || Philadelphia  || 3–2 || NY Rangers || OT || Esche || 18,200 || 31–13–8 || 70 || 
|-

|- style="background:#fcf;"
| 53 || February 2 || Philadelphia  || 2–4 || Buffalo ||  || Esche || 18,690 || 31–14–8 || 70 || 
|- style="background:#ffc;"
| 54 || February 4 || NY Rangers || 4–3 || Philadelphia  || OT || Esche || 19,801 || 31–14–9 || 71 || 
|- style="background:#fcf;"
| 55 || February 5 || Philadelphia || 0–5 || Montreal  ||  || Niittymaki || 21,273 || 31–15–9 || 71 || 
|- style="background:#cfc;"
| 56 || February 8 || NY Islanders  || 2–5 || Philadelphia ||  || Esche || 19,603 || 32–15–9 || 73 || 
|- style="background:#cfc;"
| 57 || February 10 || Washington  || 4–5 || Philadelphia ||  || Esche || 19,692 || 33–15–9 || 75 || 
|- style="background:#fcf;"
| 58 || February 11 || Philadelphia  || 2–3 || Ottawa ||  || Niittymaki || 19,834 || 33–16–9 || 75 || 
|-

|- style="background:#ffc;"
| 59 || March 1 || Philadelphia  || 1–2 || New Jersey || SO || Esche || 16,067 || 33–16–10 || 76 || 
|- style="background:#fcf;"
| 60 || March 2 || NY Rangers  || 6–1 || Philadelphia ||   || Esche || 19,682|| 33–17–10 || 76 || 
|- style="background:#fcf;"
| 61 || March 4 || Philadelphia  || 2–4 || NY Islanders ||   || Niittymaki || 16,234|| 33–18–10 || 76 || 
|- style="background:#cfc;"
| 62 || March 6 || Montreal  || 4–5 || Philadelphia || SO || Esche || 19,561|| 34–18–10 || 78 || 
|- style="background:#cfc;"
| 63 || March 8 || Carolina  || 2–3 || Philadelphia || SO || Niittymaki || 19,644|| 35–18–10 || 80 || 
|- style="background:#fcf;"
| 64 || March 11 || Buffalo  || 6–5 || Philadelphia ||  || Niittymaki || 19,717|| 35–19–10 || 80 || 
|- style="background:#fcf;"
| 65 || March 12 || Philadelphia  || 0–2 || Pittsburgh ||  || Esche || 14,904|| 35–20–10 || 80 || 
|- style="background:#cfc;"
| 66 || March 15 || Philadelphia  || 4–0 || Florida ||  || Esche || 15,614|| 36–20–10 || 82 || 
|- style="background:#fcf;"
| 67 || March 17 || Philadelphia  || 3–6 || Tampa Bay ||  || Esche || 20,834|| 36–21–10 || 82 || 
|- style="background:#cfc;"
| 68 || March 18 || Philadelphia  || 4–2 || Atlanta ||  || Niittymaki || 18,612|| 37–21–10 || 84 || 
|- style="background:#cfc;"
| 69 || March 21 || New Jersey  || 1–2 || Philadelphia ||  || Niittymaki || 19,777|| 38–21–10 || 86 || 
|- style="background:#cfc;"
| 70 || March 22 || Philadelphia  || 6–3 || NY Rangers ||  || Esche || 18,200|| 39–21–10 || 88 || 
|- style="background:#cfc;"
| 71 || March 25 || Ottawa  || 3–6 || Philadelphia ||  || Niittymaki || 19,869|| 40–21–10 || 90 || 
|- style="background:#fcf;"
| 72 || March 28 || Toronto  || 3–2 || Philadelphia ||  || Niittymaki || 19,651|| 40–22–10 || 90 || 
|-

|- style="background:#fcf;"
| 73 || April 1 || New Jersey  || 4–1 || Philadelphia ||  || Niittymaki || 19,710|| 40–23–10 || 90 || 
|- style="background:#cfc;"
| 74 || April 2 || Philadelphia  || 4–1 || NY Islanders ||  || Esche || 12,125|| 41–23–10 || 92 || 
|- style="background:#ffc;"
| 75 || April 4 || Philadelphia  || 2–3 || NY Rangers || SO || Esche || 18,200|| 41–23–11 || 93 || 
|- style="background:#cfc;"
| 76 || April 7 || Philadelphia  || 4–2 || Buffalo ||  || Esche || 16,909|| 42–23–11 || 95 || 
|- style="background:#fcf;"
| 77 || April 8 || Toronto  || 5–2 || Philadelphia ||  || Niittymaki || 19,783|| 42–24–11 || 95 || 
|- style="background:#cfc;"
| 78 || April 11 || Pittsburgh  || 3–4 || Philadelphia ||  || Esche || 19,756|| 43–24–11 || 97 || 
|- style="background:#fcf;"
| 79 || April 13 || Philadelphia  || 1–4 || New Jersey ||  || Esche || 15,628|| 43–25–11 || 97 || 
|- style="background:#cfc;"
| 80 || April 15 || NY Rangers  || 1–4 || Philadelphia ||  || Niittymaki || 19,810|| 44–25–11 || 99 || 
|- style="background:#fcf;"
| 81 || April 16 || Philadelphia  || 1–5 || New Jersey ||  || Esche || 15,981|| 44–26–11 || 99 || 
|- style="background:#cfc;"
| 82 || April 18 || Philadelphia  || 4–1 || NY Islanders || || Esche || 10,524 || 45–26–11 || 101 || 
|-

|-
| Legend:

Playoffs

|- style="background:#fcf;"
| 1 || April 22 || Philadelphia || 2–3 || Buffalo || 2OT || Esche || 18,690 || Sabres lead 1–0 || 
|- style="background:#fcf;"
| 2 || April 24 || Philadelphia || 2–8 || Buffalo ||  || Esche || 18,690  || Sabres lead 2–0 || 
|- style="background:#cfc;"
| 3 || April 26 || Buffalo || 2–4 || Philadelphia ||  || Esche || 19,984 || Sabres lead 2–1 || 
|- style="background:#cfc;"
| 4 || April 28 || Buffalo || 4–5 || Philadelphia ||  || Esche || 20,092 || Series tied 2–2 || 
|- style="background:#fcf;"
| 5 || April 30 || Philadelphia || 0–3 || Buffalo ||  || Esche || 18,690 || Sabres lead 3–2 || 
|- style="background:#fcf;"
| 6 || May 2 || Buffalo || 7–1 || Philadelphia ||  || Esche || 19,967 || Sabres win 4–2 || 
|-

|-
| Legend:

Player statistics

Scoring
 Position abbreviations: C = Center; D = Defense; G = Goaltender; LW = Left Wing; RW = Right Wing
  = Joined team via a transaction (e.g., trade, waivers, signing) during the season. Stats reflect time with the Flyers only.
  = Left team via a transaction (e.g., trade, waivers, release) during the season. Stats reflect time with the Flyers only.

Goaltending

Awards and records

Awards

Records

Among the team records set during the 2005–06 season was Simon Gagne taking seven seconds to score the fastest overtime goal in team history on January 6 against the New York Rangers. On February 8, rookie Mike Richards tied the team record for most shorthanded goals scored in a single game (2).

Transactions
The Flyers were involved in the following transactions from February 17, 2005, the day after the  season was officially canceled, through June 19, 2006, the day of the deciding game of the 2006 Stanley Cup Finals.

Trades

Players acquired

Players lost

Signings

Draft picks

Philadelphia's picks at the 2005 NHL Entry Draft, which was held at the Westin Hotel Ottawa in Ottawa, Ontario on July 30, 2005. The Flyers traded their originally allotted second, third, and fourth-round picks in three separate trades.

Farm teams
The Flyers were affiliated with the Philadelphia Phantoms of the AHL and the Trenton Titans of the ECHL.

Notes

References
General
 
 
 
Specific

Phil
Phil
Philadelphia Flyers seasons
Philadelphia
Philadelphia